Sikhism is a small minority religion in Japan. The gurdwaras are in mainly located in Tokyo and Kobe.

References

External links

Japan
Religion in Japan
Sikhism in Asia